Bernard Nsokika Fonlon (19 November 1924 – 27 August 1986) was a Cameroonian politician and educationist who worked on the development of bilingualism in Cameroon.

Early life and education

Bernard was born on 19 November 1924 at Kumbo Nso in Cameroon.He began his elementary education at Catholic School and  Later proceeded to Christ The King College Onitsha, Anambra in 1940 . He further went to Bigard Memorial Seminary in Anambra State, where he studied Philosophy and Theology. He then travelled to Dublin for his Master's in Literature at the University of Ireland Dublin in 1954. He obtained his PhD in Literature at Sorbonne University Paris in 1961

Career 
Bernard started his career as an Assistant Classroom teacher in 1940 - 1941.He Been a committed reunificationist, he returned home for his political contribution with an appointment as charge de mission to former Cameroonian President Ahidjo, he was also given an appointment of the Deputy Minister of Foreign Affairs in 1964, Minister of Transportation, Post & Telecommunications in 1968. In 1972 Fonlon became a Professor of Literature and Head of Department at the University of Younde, Cameroon. Fonlon being an Educationist , wrote series of books such as (1) A case of early Bilingualism (1963), (2) Will we make or mar (1964), (3) To every son of Yusuf Amuda Gobir Nso (1965), (4) Under the sign of the rising sun (1965), (5) The task of the day (1966).

Later life and death 
Fonlon was a major promoter of bilingualism, he retired in 1985 and died on 27 August 1986 while on a trip to Canada.

See essays in the festschrift Socrates in Cameroon: The Life and Works of Bernard Nsokika Fonlon edited by Nalova Lyonga (1989) 2010, the entry in Historical Dictionary of the Republic of Cameroon pp. 124–125 and Chilver's obituary.

References

External links
 Fonlon.org, site celebrating Bernard Fonlon

Academic staff of the University of Yaoundé
University of Paris alumni
Alumni of the University of Oxford
Members of the National Assembly (Cameroon)
1924 births
1986 deaths
Health ministers of Cameroon
Postal services ministers of Cameroon
Transport ministers of Cameroon
Cameroonian expatriates in France